Edmund Alexander Rouse (2 February 1926 – 28 July 2002) was an Australian businessman and political figure. He spent three decades as the chairman of Tasmanian media company ENT before being embroiled in a political scandal in 1989.

As chairman of logging company Gunns he offered $110,000 to Labor MP Jim Cox to cross the floor. The bribe was an attempt to prevent the Labor party forming an alliance with the Tasmanian Greens, and to secure the return of the Liberal government of Robin Gray. Cox reported the bribe to the police, and Rouse was ultimately given a three-year prison sentence.

He died in Melbourne in 2002.

References

1926 births
2002 deaths
Businesspeople from Melbourne
People stripped of a British Commonwealth honour